Bommai Nayagi is a 2023 Indian Tamil-language social drama film written and directed by Shan in his directorial debut and produced by Pa. Ranjith under Neelam Production, the film being stars Yogi Babu in the lead role. The music was composed by Sundaramurthy K S, cinematography handled by Athisayaraj R and edited by Selva R. K. This film received critical acclaim from critics and audiences.

Plot 

Velu, who works in a tea shop, fights for justice for his nine-year-old daughter, who has been subjected to sexual assault.

Cast

Production 
The first look poster of the film was released on 22 July 2022. The shooting of the film was wrapped up on 24 November 2021. Yogi Babu started dubbing for his portions on 1 February 2022.

Soundtrack

The soundtrack album is composed by Sundaramurthy K S, the audio rights were purchased by Think Music. The first single titled "Adiye Raasaathi" was released on 6 January 2023 and it is a melody number. The song written by Kabilan, compsed by Sundaramurthy K S and sung by Sathyaprakash.

Release

Theatrical 
The film was released theatrically on 3 February 2023.

Home media 
The post theatrical streaming rights of the film is sold to ZEE5, while the satellite rights of the film is sold to Zee Tamil.

References

External links 
 Neelam Productions
 

Indian drama films
2020s Tamil-language films